August Eberhard Müller (13 December 1767, Northeim – 3 December 1817, Weimar) was a German composer, organist and choir leader.

Life
Trained by his organist father, he made his first public performance aged eight. He then studied under Johann Christoph Friedrich Bach at  Bückeburg, where Müller served as organist at the Ulrichskirche until 1788. From 1789 he worked as choir leader, teacher and organist in Magdeburg.

On the recommendation of Johann Friedrich Reichardt, whom he had met in Berlin in 1792, Müller was made organist of the St. Nicholas Church in Leipzig in 1794. In 1800 he was made the assistant to Johann Adam Hiller, who he succeeded as Thomaskantor on his death in 1804. In 1810 he became Kapellmeister of the ducal court in Weimar.

Müller kept J. S. Bach's works in the repertoire and also contributed to the spread of Viennese Classicism. In 1801 he conducted the first performance outside Vienna of Haydn's The Seasons. He composed for the piano, writing two concertos, fourteen sonatas and various capriccios and other pieces. He also wrote seven flute concertos and other works for flute and orchestra, along with études for flute and piano. His son, Theodor Amadeus Müller, was a violinist.

Works 
 Anleitung zum genauen und richtigen Vortrage der Mozart´schen Clavierconcerte in Absicht richtiger Applicatur. Leipzig 1797
 La Clemenza di Tito / Opera seria composta da W. A. Mozart. Titus / ernsthafte Oper in zwei Akten von W. A. Mozart / aufs neue für das Klavier ausgezogen von A[ugust] E.[berhard] Müller. Bei Breitkopf und Härtel in Leipzig. Pr. 2 Thlr. [1803; his first piano adaptation of the opera appeared in 1795].

External links 
 
Robert Eitner: August Eberhard Müller. In: Allgemeine Deutsche Biographie (ADB). Vol 22, Duncker & Humblot, Leipzig 1885, p. 515–517.
 

1767 births
1817 deaths
Thomaskantors
German male composers
German choral conductors
German male conductors (music)
18th-century conductors (music)
19th-century conductors (music)
German organists
German male organists
18th-century German composers
18th-century German male musicians
19th-century German composers
18th-century keyboardists